Eduardo Vilarete (born 20 June 1953) is a Colombian footballer. He played in three matches for the Colombia national football team from 1977 to 1981. He was also part of Colombia's squad for the 1979 Copa América tournament.

References

External links
 

1953 births
Living people
Colombian footballers
Colombia international footballers
Association football forwards
Atlético Bucaramanga footballers
Unión Magdalena footballers
Atlético Nacional footballers
Deportivo Pereira footballers
Deportes Tolima footballers
S.D. Quito footballers
L.D.U. Quito footballers
Colombian expatriate footballers
Expatriate footballers in Ecuador
Deportes Tolima managers